The Threat is the 21st book in the Animorphs series, written by K.A. Applegate. It is narrated by Jake. It is the second book in the David trilogy.

Plot summary

After falling from the Blade ship, the Animorphs are snagged from mid-air by Rachel and Tobias, in their respective eagle and hawk morphs. They land on the beach, needing a plan to infiltrate the Marriott resort. Jake becomes aware of the tensions between David and Marco, and is disturbed by David's unnecessary excesses. The team morphs into seagulls, and spy out the area, crawling with security agents armed to the teeth and accompanied by dogs. They're zapped by a security man wearing sunglasses with weak Dracon beam emitters built into them. Jake tells them to leave.

Upon his return home, Jake's parents tell him and his brother Tom that their obnoxious cousin, Saddler, was gravely injured in a car accident, and that they were leaving town to spend time with his parents. Jake is presented with the opportunity to advance his plans. Unfortunately, that night, David disappears from Cassie's barn. Jake morphs into his dog, Homer, and tracks David's scent to an inn. David had morphed into a golden eagle, smashed the window with a rock and entered a room without paying. Jake warns him of the consequences of this action, while also saying he won't have time to help David with his living problems until after the mission. David doesn't hide his contempt, but leaves with Jake anyway.

Cassie formulates a plan to infiltrate the resort. Jake morphs into a dragonfly, while the other Animorphs, with the exception of Tobias, morph into fleas and latch onto Jake's body. Tobias guides them to the hotel. Inside, Jake tries to find the banquet hall where the speeches and infestations will take place. Inside an air vent, he gets caught in a spider web. Terrified, Jake demorphs, and the others follow. Cassie is badly wounded when Jake's demorphing creates a human artery that forces more blood into her flea body than it is prepared to hold. He releases them, and they begin demorphing. Marco is stuck mid-morph, as a giant flea. They begin to despair, but Cassie guides Marco and enables him to demorph. Marco then becomes emotional, something very unlike him.

Jake inspects the banquet room, and notices the number of holograms in place. Here they discover how the Yeerks plan to infest each world leader, Visser Three having infiltrated the facility by acquiring and morphing Tony, the White House Chief of Staff, although there are two schools of thought about why he would do this: Ax theorizes that it was because there would be no way for the man to have access to a Kandrona if he is infested and something goes wrong with the mission, whereas Cassie thinks that it is simply Visser Three's ego wanting him to take the key role in a plan that could result in the Yeerks winning the war for Earth at last. Now the Animorphs need a plan to thwart it. They return to the resort, knock out the guards, morph into them, and reenter the banquet. Soon they realize they have been deceived, and have fallen into Visser Three's trap. David is frightened and turns against the Animorphs in order to preserve his own life, Cassie having to attack him to stop him revealing who they are. It isn't long, though, before they discover that the Hork-Bajir surrounding them are only holograms. They take the Visser hostage, and both groups then withdraw on a truce. The Animorphs, now disgusted and angry with David, try to plan their next move before it's too late.

However, during the night, David returns to his old home in eagle morph. Jake and Ax pursue him, only to find that David had apparently killed Tobias. David explains that the Animorphs weren't treating him as an equal, and that he'd have to take matters into his own hands. Enraged, Jake engages David, only to be ambushed by Hork-Bajir. Ax rescues Jake, and they escape. David then leads Jake to the mall, and they each morph their battle morphs, lion and tiger respectively. After a brief duel, David severs Jake's carotid artery, leaving him to bleed to death.

Morphs

Animorphs books
1998 novels